Nyttingnes is a hamlet with 28 inhabitants and 9 houses in the municipality of Kinn in Vestland county, Norway. In recent history, there has been a negative demographic trend in this village. Nyttingnes is made up of the farms: Tunet, Bakken, Pergarden, Ludviggarden, Kvia and Opptun. Historically, the inhabitants were farmers and fishermen. The nearby Skårafjæra beach area is popular for many tourists.

References

Kinn
Villages in Vestland